Richard David Stemp (born 11 December 1967) is an English former first-class cricketer, who appeared for county sides—Worcestershire, Yorkshire, Nottinghamshire and Leicestershire—in a first-class career which spanned from 1990 to 2002.

Stemp was a slow left arm bowler, and was a member of the England squad picked to play New Zealand in 1994, but was left out of the final eleven.

Stemp was called up for the England A Tour of India and Bangladesh that winter and took 6-83 in the 1st unnoffical 'Test', including a young Rahul Dravid among his wickets. In his review of the tour, Simon Hughes said Stemp was a "Test class spinner, good athlete but needs careful handling", suggesting "the more phlegmatic" Min Patel might be easier for then England captain Michael Atherton to handle. Although Stemp took more wickets than the two other spinners on the tour, it was Patel and Ian Salisbury who would have the Test careers. Stemp did join another England A tour to Pakistan the following winter, taking 5-64 in another victory in an unofficial 'Test'.

He currently plays for Northampton Saints in the Northants League.

References

External links
 Cricinfo Profile

1967 births
Living people
Yorkshire cricketers
Worcestershire cricketers
Nottinghamshire cricketers
Leicestershire cricketers
Cricketers from Birmingham, West Midlands
English cricketers
English cricketers of 1969 to 2000
English cricketers of the 21st century